Orange People may refer to:
La Gente Naranja (Spanish: The Orange People), a Florida-based Ecuadorian Rock en Espanol music band
"Orange People", a track on the album Surface Paradise (2009) by Melbourne band Root!
Orange People (film) (2013), originally titled Anashim Ketumim, a film by Israeli director Hanna Azoulay Hasfari
Rajneesh movement, the followers of which have been called Orange People because of the color of their clothes
Tapuz or Tapuz Anashim (Hebrew: Orange People), an Israeli Web portal

See also

Carotenosis, a disease that causes orange skin color
List of people from Orange County, California
Orange Walk People's Stadium
Orangemen (disambiguation)